Evangeline "Vange" Whedon is a fictional character, a mutant appearing in American comic books published by Marvel Comics. Whedon is a lawyer and her mutant ability is to transform into a red dragon. Her first appearance was in X-Treme X-Men #21. 

Evangeline appears in the television series The Gifted played by Erinn Ruth.

Fictional character biography
Vange Whedon is a lawyer and a member of the Mutant Rights Coalition (or Mutant Rights League). Her ability to shapeshift is triggered when she comes in contact with blood. Evangeline used to be a successful prosecutor until others learned that she was a mutant. She was fired instantly and evicted from her apartment the next day. Her fiancé left her with an e-mail and her family disowned her.

When the X-Men Bishop and Sage were being held in police custody, Whedon and the Mutant Rights League staged a protest for their release. While Evangeline was talking to Detective Cardones, a human struck the detective with a brick. The blood from the wound dripped on to Whedon, and caused her to shapeshift involuntarily. She transformed into a beast that resembled a dragon, and was out of control. Sage was able to stop Vange momentarily, while Bishop calmed her down enough to revert to her human form.

Evangeline was called to Los Angeles when the X-Men needed legal help. Evangeline succeeded in getting Marie D'Ancanto, an anti-mutant terrorist, given a second chance by the X-Men, under probation and hired her as an assistant. Evangeline also helped the X-Men against a lawyer secretly working for the psychic mutant Elias Bogan.

X-Men: The 198 Files reveals that she kept her powers after the "Decimation" of the mutant population - the government considers her a 'Significant' national security threat. She currently still acts as the X-Men's lawyer.

Later, after the Second Coming crossover, she is seen as Teon's lawyer and defends him in court to keep him from being returned to the custody of his parents.

Powers and abilities
Vange Whedon is a metamorph, and can transform herself into an enormous winged red dragon. This can be triggered consciously or by the presence of blood. In this form she has all the powers of a dragon, such as fiery breath and tough scales.

In other media

Television
Erinn Ruth portrayed the character in the Season 1 finale episode "X-roads" of the live-action TV-series The Gifted. She visited Lorna Dane (Polaris) in a mental institution to inform her that the X-Men have chosen her as one of the leaders of the Mutant Underground. Evangeline demonstrated her mutant gifts by shifting her hand into its draconic form, turning the skin red and her nails growing out into black claws as well as blowing steam from her nose. Ruth reprised her role in Season 2, in the "unMoored" episode. In a flashback, she was revealed to have recruited John Proudstar (Thunderbird) to lead the Atlanta station for the Mutant Underground. In the present day, Whedon is a mutant rights lawyer. She helps give John and Clarice information to find Erg, a mutant who could have information on the Inner Circle. In "hoMe", Evangeline calls the station leaders of the Underground to discuss how to deal with the Inner Circle but their enemies assault the meeting place and Evangeline is presumed dead. In the same episode, Erg mentions that he and Evangeline co-founded the Mutant Underground but cut ties with each other when one of their human allies betrayed them leading to Sentinel Services intercepting one of their attempts to smuggle mutants across the border, in which Evangeline was forced to save Erg but leave their charges to the mercy of their enemies.

References

External links
UncannyXmen.net, Character information of Evangeline Whedon

Characters created by Chris Claremont
Characters created by Salvador Larroca
Comics characters introduced in 2003
Fictional human rights activists
Fictional prosecutors
Fictional therianthropes
Marvel Comics characters who are shapeshifters
Marvel Comics characters with superhuman strength
Marvel Comics female characters
Marvel Comics mutants